Zenski Kosarkaski Klub Novi Zagreb, a.k.a. Lupa Promotion Novi Zagreb for sponsorship reasons, is a Croatian women's basketball club from Zagreb founded in 1978 playing in the Croatian League. In 2012 it was the runner-up in both the championship and the national cup, qualifying for the first time for the Euroleague.

History

Arena

Honours

Domestic
National Championships – 1

 Croatian Women's Basketball League:
Winners (1): 2013
Runners-up (1): 2014

National Cups – 1

Ružica Meglaj-Rimac Cup:
Winners (1): 2013

Players

 (1.98)  Luca Ivanković
 (1.86)  Jelena Ivezić
 (1.83)  Lisa Karčić
 (1.79)  Antonija Jurić
 (1.80)  Ivana Dojkic
 (1.82)  Eva Komplet
 (1.86)  Tihana Stojsavljević
 (1.74)  Iva Cigić
 (1.86)  Kristina Benić
 (1.88)  Ana Semren
 (1.76)  Elina Babkina

Notable former players
Elīna Babkina
Luca Ivanković
Lisa Ann Karčić
Jelena Ivezić
Milica Dabović

Notable former coaches

References

External links

Novi Zagreb
EuroLeague Women clubs
Sports teams in Zagreb
Basketball teams established in 1978
Women's basketball teams in Yugoslavia